Simon Petrov (born 27 January 1976) is a Slovenian professional basketball coach and former player. He currently serves as the head coach for Oroszlány SE Lions of the Nemzeti Bajnokság I/A, the top flight in Hungary.

International career
He was a member of the Slovenian under-22 national team and competed with the senior team at the 2003 European Championship.

References

External links
Player Profile at abaliga.com

1976 births
Living people
Sportspeople from Novo Mesto
Slovenian men's basketball players
Guards (basketball)
KK Krka players
KK Krka coaches
ASVEL Basket players
KK Olimpija players
AEL Limassol B.C. players
Bandırma B.İ.K. players
Olympias Patras B.C. players
Slovenian basketball coaches
Slovenian expatriate basketball people in France
Slovenian expatriate sportspeople in Cyprus
Slovenian expatriate basketball people in Turkey
Slovenian expatriate basketball people in Italy